Dato' Mohd Nizar bin Zakaria (Jawi: محمد نزار بن زكريا; born 3 January 1969) is a Malaysian politician. Nizar is the current two-term Member of Parliament (MP) of Malaysia for Parit constituency, having previously held the same office between 2008 and 2013. He is a member of the United Malays National Organisation (UMNO) party in the ruling Barisan Nasional (BN) coalition.

Nizar was elected to Parliament in the 2008 Malaysian general election for the UMNO held seat of Parit. In June 2010, he was a passenger on the MV Rachel Corrie when it was seized by the Israel Defense Forces while attempting to deliver supplies to Gaza.

For the 2013 Malaysian general election, Nizar left parliament to contest, and eventually won, the Perak State Legislative Assembly seat of Belanja.

Election results

Honours
  :
  Knight of the Order of Cura Si Manja Kini (DPCM) - Dato' (2014)

See also
 Parit (federal constituency)

References

Living people
1969 births
People from Perak
Members of the Dewan Rakyat
Members of the Perak State Legislative Assembly
Perak state executive councillors
United Malays National Organisation politicians
Malaysian people of Malay descent
Malaysian Muslims
21st-century Malaysian politicians